James McGill Souness (9 November 1928 – 2 September 1990) was a Scottish footballer and cricketer. Souness played for both of the Edinburgh derby rivals, Hibs and Hearts. An outside right, Souness was unable to break into the Hibs team ahead of Scotland international Gordon Smith. He moved to Hearts in 1953 and helped the club win the 1954–55 Scottish League Cup. Souness retired from playing football soon afterwards, when he became a qualified actuary.

Souness played in three first class matches for the Scotland cricket team.

After retiring from competitive sport, Souness climbed over 200 of the Scottish Munros. In September 1990, he was killed in a climbing accident on the Jungfrau mountain in Switzerland, the day after he retired. His sons witnessed the accident.

See also
List of Scottish cricket and football players

References

External links
Cricket Archive profile
London Hearts Supporters' Club profile

1928 births
1990 deaths
Cricketers from Edinburgh
Scottish cricketers
Scottish footballers
Scottish Football League players
Hibernian F.C. players
Falkirk F.C. players
Heart of Midlothian F.C. players
Sport deaths in Switzerland
Association football outside forwards
People educated at George Heriot's School
Footballers from Edinburgh